Andrea Okene Bañón (30 November 2001) is a Spanish footballer who plays as a forward for Valencia. She is a product of Levante UD youth system, and debuted in Primera División in April 2021. In July 2021, she joined Valencia as the sixth signing of the season. She was born from a Nigerian father and a Spanish mother.

References

External links 

 Profile at La Liga

2001 births
Living people
Footballers from the Valencian Community
Spanish women's footballers
Women's association football forwards
Levante UD Femenino players
Valencia CF Femenino players
Primera División (women) players
Spanish people of Nigerian descent
Spanish sportspeople of African descent